Kakkivadanpatti is a small village in Virudhunagar district, Tamil Nadu, India, near Sivakasi.
Most of the population are farmers and speak both Tamil and Telugu.

Facilities
 Post Office kakkivadanpatti 626124
 BSNL Exchange Kakkivadanpatti

Education
 R. Ponnuchamy Naidu Middle school Kakkivadanpatti

Adjacent communities 
It is surrounded by other villages like Maraneri, Mamsapuram, Kallamanaiackanpatti and towns Sivakasi and Alangulum.

References

Villages in Virudhunagar district